Frank Peter Joseph Crosetti (October 4, 1910 – February 11, 2002) was an American baseball shortstop. Nicknamed "The Crow", he spent his entire seventeen-year Major League Baseball playing career with the New York Yankees before becoming a coach with the franchise for an additional twenty seasons. As a player and third base coach for the Yankees, Crosetti was part of seventeen World Championship teams and 23 World Series participants overall (1932–1964), the most of any individual.

Early years
Crosetti was born in San Francisco, California, and grew up in North Beach, which was something of a hotbed of Italian-American talent on the baseball field during the 1920s and 1930s (Tony Lazzeri, Charlie Silvera and the three DiMaggio brothers also hail from the same neighborhood). Before joining the Yankees, Crosetti played four seasons with the San Francisco Seals of the Pacific Coast League.

New York Yankees

He was part of a World Series championship his first year in the big leagues as the Yankees completed a four-game sweep of the Chicago Cubs in the 1932 World Series two days shy of Crosetti's 22nd birthday.

Batting lead-off, he was named an American League All-Star for the first time in his career, and reached the World Series for the second time. Crosetti batted .269 in the Yankees' six-game victory over the New York Giants in the 1936 World Series, and drove in the winning run in the Yankees' 2–1 victory in Game 3. The 1936 season was the first of a string of four World Series titles for Crosetti and the Yankees.

Crosetti then became a player/coach for the club through the  season.

Career stats

In 29 World Series games, Crosetti batted .174 with one home run, 11 RBI, and 16 runs scored. His only World Series home run was a two-run shot off Dizzy Dean in Game 2 of the 1938 World Series that gave the Yankees a 4–3 lead over the Cubs. Perhaps Crosetti's second most memorable moment in postseason play occurred in Game 3 of the 1942 World Series when he shoved umpire Bill Summers, an act for which he received a $250 fine from Commissioner Kenesaw Mountain Landis and was suspended the first 30 games of the  season.

Crosetti led the American League in plate appearances twice ( and ), stolen bases once (1938), strikeouts twice ( and 1938) and in being hit by pitches eight times (1936–40,  and ). He was known as the weak link in the Yankees batting order, but he was also known as a slick fielder and for his ability to pull off the hidden ball trick. Crosetti earned eight World Series rings as a player, and was a two-time All-Star (1936 and 1939).

Coaching career
Crosetti became third base coach with the Yankees in 1947 and was part of an additional nine World Series championships as a coach with the franchise after he retired as a player following the 1948 season. He was said to be the "perfect coach", because he had no ambition whatsoever to manage, turning down numerous offers over the years to do so.

It has been said of Crosetti that he has waved home 16,000 runners in 25 years in the third-base coaching box.

Death
Crosetti died in 2002 at age 91 from complications of a fall in Stockton, California and was entombed at Holy Cross Cemetery in Colma. He was survived by his wife of 63 years, Norma, his son, John, and his daughter, Ellen. He was the last surviving member of the 1932, 1936, 1937, and 1939 World Champion New York Yankees.

See also

List of Major League Baseball career runs scored leaders
List of Major League Baseball annual stolen base leaders
List of Major League Baseball players who spent their entire career with one franchise

References

External links 
, or Baseball Almanac, or Baseball Biography

1910 births
2002 deaths
Baseball coaches from California
American people of Italian descent
American League All-Stars
American League stolen base champions
Baseball players from San Francisco
Burials at Holy Cross Cemetery (Colma, California)
Major League Baseball shortstops
Major League Baseball third base coaches
Minnesota Twins coaches
New York Yankees coaches
New York Yankees players
Sportspeople from New Rochelle, New York
San Francisco Seals (baseball) players
Seattle Pilots coaches
Deaths from falls